Orrorin tugenensis is a postulated early species of Homininae, estimated at  and discovered in 2000. It is not confirmed how Orrorin is related to modern humans. Its discovery was used to argue against the hypothesis that australopithecines are human ancestors, although this remains the most prevalent hypothesis of human evolution as of 2012.

The name of genus Orrorin (plural Orroriek) means "original man" in Tugen, and the name of O. tugenensis derives from Tugen Hills in Kenya, where the first fossil was found in 2000. As of 2007, 20 fossils of the species have been found.

A second species, O. praegens, was recently assigned to the genus. This species is younger than O. tugenensis, and dates to the Pliocene.

Fossils
The 20 specimens found as of 2007 are believed to be from at least five individuals. They include: the posterior part of a mandible in two pieces; a symphysis and several isolated teeth; three fragments of femora; a partial humerus; a proximal phalanx; and a distal thumb phalanx.

Orrorin had small teeth relative to its body size. Its dentition differs from that found in Australopithecus in that its cheek teeth are smaller and less elongated mesiodistally and from Ardipithecus in that its enamel is thicker. The dentition differs from both these species in the presence of a mesial groove on the upper canines. The canines are ape-like but reduced, like those found in Miocene apes and female chimpanzees. Orrorin had small post-canines and was microdont, like modern humans, whereas australopithecines were megadont. However, some researchers have denied that this is compelling evidence that Orrorin was more closely related to modern humans than australopithecines as early members of the genus Homo, who were almost certainly the direct ancestors of modern humans, were also megadonts.

In the femur, the head is spherical and rotated anteriorly; the neck is elongated and oval in section and the lesser trochanter protrudes medially. While these suggest that Orrorin was bipedal, the rest of the postcranium indicates it climbed trees. While the proximal phalanx is curved, the distal pollical phalanx is of human proportions and has thus been associated with toolmaking, but should probably be associated with grasping abilities useful for tree-climbing in this context. 

After the fossils were found in 2000, they were held at the Kipsaraman village community museum, but the museum was subsequently closed. Since then, according to the Community Museums of Kenya chairman Eustace Kitonga, the fossils are stored at a secret bank vault in Nairobi. 

More recently, in 2017, impressions resembling human-like footprints
were reported on the island of Crete in Greece.  These "Trachilos footprints", found in fossilized beach sediments near the west Cretan village of Trachilos, have been dated to a similar time period as the Orrorin fossils, 6.05 million years before present.  However, there is no consensus that these impressions are distinct enough to confidently assign to a primate or even a vertebrate, or that they are indeed footprints at all.

Classification
If Orrorin proves to be a direct human ancestor, then according to some paleoanthropologists, australopithecines such as Australopithecus afarensis ("Lucy") may be considered a side branch of the hominid family tree: Orrorin is both earlier, by almost 3 million years, and more similar to modern humans than is A. afarensis. The main similarity is that the Orrorin femur is morphologically closer to that of Homo sapiens than is Lucy's; there is, however, some debate over this point. This debate is largely centered around the fact that Lucy was female and the Orrorin femur it has been compared to belonged to a male.

Another point of view cites comparisons between Orrorin and other Miocene apes, rather than extant great apes, which shows instead that the femur shows itself as an intermediate between that of Australopiths and said earlier apes.

Other fossils (leaves and many mammals) found in the Lukeino Formation show that Orrorin lived in a dry evergreen forest environment, not the savanna assumed by many theories of human evolution.

Evolution of bipedalism 
The fossils of Orrorin tugenensis share no derived features of hominoid great-ape relatives. In contrast, "Orrorin shares several apomorphic features with modern humans, as well as some with australopithecines, including the presence of an obturator externus groove, elongated femoral neck, anteriorly twisted head (posterior twist in Australopithecus), anteroposteriorly compressed femoral neck, asymmetric distribution of cortex in  the femoral neck, shallow superior notch, and a well developed gluteal tuberosity which coalesces vertically with  the  crest  that  descends  the  femoral  shaft  poste-riorly." It does, however, also share many of such properties with several Miocene ape species, even showing some transitional elements between basal apes like the Aegyptopithecus and Australopithecus. According to recent studies Orrorin tugenensis is a basal hominid that adapted an early form of bipedalism. Based on the structure of its femoral head it still exhibited some arboreal properties, likely to forage and build shelters. The length of the femoral neck in Orrorin tugenensis fossils is elongated and is similar in shape and length to Australopithicines and modern humans. While it was originally claimed that its femoral head is larger in comparison to Australopithicines and is much closer in shape and relative size to Homo sapiens, this claim has been challenged by some researchers who have noted that the femoral heads of male australopithicines are more akin to those of Orrorin, and by extension modern humans, than those of female australopithicines. Proponents of the notion that Orrorin is more closely related to humans than Lucy is have addressed this by asserting that the male australopithicine femurs in question in fact belong to a different species than Lucy. O. tugenensis appears to have developed bipedalism 6 million years ago.

O. tugenensis shares an early hominin feature in which their iliac blade is flared to help counter the torque of their body weight, this shows that they adapted bipedalism around 6 MYA. These features are shared with many species of Australopithecus. It has been suggested by Pickford that the many features Orrorin shares with modern humans show that it is more closely related to Homo sapiens than to Australopithecus. This would mean that Australopithecus would represent a side branch in the homin evolution that does not directly lead to Homo. However the femora morphology of O. tugenensis shares many similarities with Australopithicine femora morphology, which weakens this claim. Another study conducted by Almecija suggested that Orrorin is more closely related to early hominins than to Homo. An analysis of the BAR 10020' 00 femur showed that Orrorin is an intermediate between Pan and Australopithecus afarensis. The current prevailing theory is that Orrorin tugenensis is a basal hominin and that bipedalism developed early in the hominin clade and successfully evolved down the human evolutionary tree.  It is clear that the phylogeny of Orrorin is uncertain, however, the evidence of the evolution of bipedalism is an invaluable discovery from this early fossil hominin.

Discovery

The team that found these fossils in 2000 was led by Brigitte Senut and Martin Pickford from the Muséum national d'histoire naturelle. The 20 fossils have been found at four sites in the Lukeino Formation, located in Kenya: of these, the fossils at Cheboit and Aragai are the oldest, while those in Kapsomin and Kapcheberek are found in the upper levels of the formation.

See also

 List of human evolution fossils (with images)
 Martin Pickford

Notes

References

External links

 Orrorin tugenensis - The Smithsonian Institution's Human Origins Program
 Human Timeline (Interactive) – Smithsonian, National Museum of Natural History (August 2016).

Homininae
Miocene primates of Africa
Pliocene primates
Fossil taxa described in 2001
Prehistoric Kenya
Baringo County
Articles containing video clips
Taxa named by Martin Pickford